Herbert Giblin Furnell (24 October 1898 – 22 November 1973) was an Australian rules footballer who played for the Carlton Football Club in the Victorian Football League (VFL).

Born in Maryborough, Victoria, Furnell won a scholarships to Geelong Church of England Grammar School and then entered Trinity College (University of Melbourne) where he completed his medical degrees, graduating in 1921.

During World War II, Furnell served with the Australian Army Medical Corps, and was in command of the 2nd/2nd Field Ambulance, serving in Libya where he was awarded the Distinguished Service Order. Promoted to colonel, he served at Tobruk and El Alamein, and then in New Guinea with the rank of brigadier, being mentioned in despatches no fewer than five times and being appointed CBE.

References

External links 
		
Harry Furnell's profile at Blueseum

1898 births
1973 deaths
Australian rules footballers from Victoria (Australia)
Carlton Football Club players
University Blacks Football Club players
People educated at Trinity College (University of Melbourne)
Australian Army personnel of World War II
Military personnel from Victoria (Australia)
Australian brigadiers